KHBX may refer to:

 KHBX-LP, a low-power radio station (99.3 FM) licensed to serve Hobbs, New Mexico, United States
 Dog Bites Man, which featured a fake TV station named KHBX